Nina Josu (born February 17, 1953 in Țiganca) is a writer and activist from Moldova. She is the head of the Association for Romanian Literature and Culture "ASTRA" - "Onisifor Ghibu".

Biography

Nina Josu graduated from Maxim Gorky Literature Institute in 1976. She is a member of the Moldovan Writers' Union. Nina Josu works for Literatura și Arta.

Nina Josu is president of the Association for Romanian Literature and Culture "ASTRA" - "Onisifor Ghibu", Chişinău (reactivated on November 17, 1994). She is a leader of Democratic Forum of Romanians in Moldova.

Works
 La sezători, 1975, preface by P. Boțu,
 Trecere în alb, 1980;
 Stare totală, 1986;
 Dorul, 1991

References

External links 
 Convorbiri Literare, NINA JOSU SI VIZIONARISMUL SERAFIC
 Literatura şi Arta, IDEAL – voce poetică a destinului românesc
 Autorul fotografiilor: Nicolae Răileanu.

1953 births
People from Cahul District
Moldovan writers
20th-century Romanian writers
Moldovan activists
Moldovan women writers
Living people
Romanian writers
20th-century Romanian women writers